Aziz Kandi (also Romanized as ‘Azīz Kandī) is a village in Qaranqu Rural District, in the Central District of Hashtrud County, East Azerbaijan Province, Iran. At the 2006 census, its population was 314, in 67 families.

References 

Towns and villages in Hashtrud County